Tut-e Lashkaran (also Romanized as Tūt-e Lashkarān; also known as Tūt-e Lashgarān) is a village in Jannatabad Rural District, Salehabad County, Razavi Khorasan Province, Iran. At the 2006 census, its population was 254, in 58 families.

References 

Populated places in   Torbat-e Jam County